is a 1959 Japanese action and yakuza film directed by Buichi Saitō. It stars Akira Kobayashi. The Wandering Guitarist is the first film of Akira Kobayashi and Buichi Saitō's Wataridori series. The film made Akira Kobayashi star and he gained national popularity.

Plot
Source:
Shinji Taki is a former detective but now he is a vagabond with a guitar. In the port town he visits, Taki saves a yakuza of the Akitsu clan at a bar fight and he is hired as a bouncer of the Akitsu clan. Akitsu orders Taki to evict the inhabitants for the development of the town.

Cast
Source:
 Akira Kobayashi as Shinji Taki
 Ruriko Asaoka as Yuki Akitsu
 Joe Shishido as Joe
 Nobuo Kaneko as Reizaburō Akitsu (Head of the Akitsu clan)
 Sanae Nakahara as Shōji Sumiko
 Misako Watanabe as Rie
 Kyōji Aoyama as Yasukawa
 Tomio Aoki as Tetsu

Wataridori series
 Kuchibue ga Nagareru Minatomachi (1960)
 Naked Youth -A Story of Cruelty (1960)
 Sword and Devotion (1960)
 The Spook Cottage(1960)
 The Rambler under the Southern Cross(1961)
 Ōunabara wo Yuku Wataridori (1961)
 Kitakikōyori Wataridori Kitae Kaeru (1962)

References

External links
The Wandering Guitarist at Nikkatsu

1959 films
Nikkatsu films
1950s Japanese-language films
Japanese crime films
Films about guitars and guitarists
1950s Japanese films